United Airlines operates 872 aircraft, giving it the third largest commercial airline fleet in the world. It primarily operates a mix of Airbus and Boeing narrowbody and all Boeing widebody aircraft. With an average age of 16.5 years, United has the oldest fleet of all major US airlines.

Current fleet

, United Airlines operates the following aircraft:

Gallery

Historical fleet

References

Bibliography
 Taylor, H. A. "Boeing's Trend-Setting 247". Air Enthusiast, No. 9, February–May 1979, pp. 43–54. .

United Airlines
Lists of aircraft by operator